Gropeni is a commune located in Brăila County, Muntenia, Romania. It is composed of a single village, Gropeni.

The Balta Mică a Brăilei Natural Park is partly situated on the administrative territory of the commune.

Natives
 I. C. Massim

References

Communes in Brăila County
Localities in Muntenia